Commendatore (singular), Commendatori (plural), is an Italian word originating from the latin phrase In commendam and meaning "Commander". It may refer to:

Position, rank, title
 Commander (order), the title of honour "Commander"
 Commendatore of the Italian Republic, rank in an order of honour
 Commander (military), the military rank, using the affectation of Italian wording for illicit forces
 Leader (person in command), a leader of a group of people, using the affectation of Italian wording for an aura of respect

People
 Il Commendatore, nickname for Enzo Ferrari

Fictional characters
 Il Commendatore (aka Don Pedro), a character in the Mozart opera Don Giovanni

Arts and entertainment
 Killing Commendatore A 2017 novel written by Japanese writer Haruki Murakami
 Il Commendatore (sculpture), a statue in Prague
 Commendatori (TV episode) 2000 television episode of The Sopranos
Referenced in the Godfather Part 3 when Michael Corleone visits Paulo in Italy.

Other uses
 Isdera Commendatore, the "Commendatore", a car model manufactured by Isdera
 Palazzo del Commendatore, Rome, a building in Rome
 Salon del Commendatore, inside the palace Palazzo del Commendatore, Rome

See also

 Commander (disambiguation)